Regius may refer to:

 Regius Professor, "Royal" Professorships at the universities of Oxford, Cambridge, St Andrews, Glasgow, Aberdeen, Edinburgh and Dublin
 Raphael Regius (c.1440–1520), Venetian humanist
 Henricus Regius (1598–1679), Dutch philosopher and physician
 Codex Regius, Icelandic manuscript in which the Poetic Edda is preserved
 Hippo Regius, ancient name of the modern city of Annaba, Algeria
 Titulus Regius, 1483 statute of the Parliament of England, giving the title "King of England" to Richard III 
 Animal names:
 Argyrosomus regius, Meagre, Shade-fish, Salmon-Basse or Stone Bass
 Hylodes regius, frog of Brazil
 Phidippus regius, Regal Jumping Spider
 Philautus regius, frog of Sri Lanka
 Pseudorhabdosynochus regius, a Monogenean
 Python regius, python

See also
 Regis (disambiguation) (Latin "of the king")
 Regia (disambiguation) (Latin "royal" feminine adjective)
 Regium (disambiguation) (Latin "royal" neuter adjective)